A diss track, diss record or diss song (diss – abbr. from disrespect) is a song whose primary purpose is to verbally attack someone else, usually another artist. Diss tracks are often the result of an existing, escalating feud between the two people; for example, the artists involved may be former members of a group, or artists on rival labels.

The diss track as a medium of its own was popularized in the hip hop genre, fueled by the hip hop rivalry phenomenon (especially the East Coast–West Coast hip hop rivalry of the mid-1990s). More recently, entertainers from outside the traditional music landscape have adopted the genre.

In the course of constructing their argument, artists often include a wealth of references to past events and transgressions in their diss tracks, which listeners can dive into. Artists who are the subject of a diss track often make one of their own in response to the first. It is this back-and-forth associated with a feud that makes this type of song particularly viral. The term sneak diss refers to a type of verse in a song in which an artist refrains from mentioning a specific individual but describing or referring to them in a negative or derogatory manner.

History

Origin and early examples

An early example of a diss track was "You Keep Her" (1962) by Joe Tex. He wrote the song after his wife left him for soul singer James Brown, who then broke up with her and wrote Tex a letter saying he could have her back. Tex refused and ridiculed this offer in his song.

After Lee "Scratch" Perry left producer Coxsone Dodd, he released a track called "Run for Cover" (1967) poking fun at him. Perry in particular has a long history of releasing diss tracks directed at former musical collaborators. The musical single "People Funny Boy" (1968) attacked his former boss Joe Gibbs by adding sounds of a crying baby into the mix. In response, Gibbs himself released a track called "People Grudgeful" (1968). Perry's "Evil Tongues" (1978) was aimed at The Congos and "Judgement Inna Babylon" (1984) and "Satan Kicked the Bucket" (1988) at Chris Blackwell. Perry also attacked Michael Jackson (with whom he had never worked) on the track "Freaky Michael" (2010).

John Lennon of the Beatles wrote "Sexy Sadie", a song released on the band's 1968 album The Beatles, as a diss track aimed at Maharishi Mahesh Yogi, a guru who he felt had been a let-down to them. The original lyrics specifically targeted him, but at the request of George Harrison the lyrics became more vague.

Lennon's "How Do You Sleep?" (1971), from his solo album Imagine, is another prototypical example of a diss track. Lennon had the impression that the song "Too Many People" from Paul McCartney's Ram (1971) was a dig at him, something McCartney later admitted. Lennon thought that other songs on the album, such as "3 Legs", contained similar attacks, and the back cover of Ram, showing one stag beetle mounting another, has been described by McCartney as indicative of how he felt treated by the other members of the Beatles. As a result, Lennon's "How Do You Sleep?" indirectly mocked McCartney's musicianship. While McCartney is never mentioned in the song, the many references make clear he is the target, particularly in the lyrics "The only thing you done was yesterday/And since you've gone you're just another day", the first lyric being a reference to The Beatles' 1965 song "Yesterday" and the second line referring to McCartney's 1971 song "Another Day".

The opening track on Queen's album A Night at the Opera, "Death on Two Legs (Dedicated to...)", is a prime example of a hard rock diss track, directed toward the band's former manager. The Sex Pistols recorded two diss tracks: “New York”, aimed at The New York Dolls, and “E.M.I.”, aimed at their former record label EMI.

Wild Man Fischer wrote a song called "Frank" in 1980, which was aimed at his former record producer Frank Zappa, who enabled him to record his debut album An Evening with Wild Man Fischer (1969) but afterwards broke all contact when the mentally disturbed Fischer threw a bottle at Zappa's infant daughter and missed. Dr. Demento once played "Frank" when Zappa was a guest on his show and to his amazement Zappa turned absolutely livid with anger when he heard it, even threatening the radio host to never ever play this song again on the air.

Coalescing of the genre: Early hip-hop rivalries
In the 1980s, diss tracks began to feature prominently in the hip-hop genre. The first known hip-hop feud (or "beef") was the Roxanne Wars. The Roxanne Wars began in 1984 when Roxanne Shanté and Marley Marl released the song "Roxanne's Revenge", a diss track aimed at the trio U.T.F.O. "Roxanne's Revenge" was a quick success, leading U.T.F.O. to compose a response: they joined forces with Elease Jack and Adelaida Martinez, who adopted the stage name "The Real Roxanne," to release a song under that name in 1985. Roxanne Shanté replied soon afterward, and the feud rapidly expanded from there, with numerous other rappers writing songs that expanded upon the Roxanne mythos.

Another prominent hip-hop feud from the 1980s was The Bridge Wars, a dispute over the birthplace of hip-hop. Marley Marl and MC Shan released the track "The Bridge" in 1985, in which they were perceived as claiming that the genre originated in Queensbridge. KRS-One and Boogie Down Productions responded with "South Bronx" in 1986, and the feud continued to escalate, culminating with Boogie Down Productions' "The Bridge Is Over" in 1987.

There also existed smaller-scale rivalries during this period: Craig Werner describes "interminable ego duels between LL Cool J and Kool Moe Dee" during the later 1980s.

East Coast vs West Coast era
The East Coast–West Coast hip-hop rivalry led to increased popularity for hip-hop diss tracks. This feud began with Bronx rapper Tim Dog's 1991 song "Fuck Compton", which expressed his anger at record companies' preference of West Coast artists over the East Coast. This song provoked many responses, including Dr. Dre's single "Fuck Wit Dre Day" the following year. "Fuck Wit Dre Day" is also notable as a diss track that emerged from the breakup of the group N.W.A., taking shots at former group member Eazy-E. The N.W.A. breakup also led to Ice Cube's diss track "No Vaseline" in 1991.

The East Coast–West Coast rivalry came to be exemplified by the feud between 2Pac and the Notorious B.I.G., which began after Biggie's song "Who Shot Ya?" was interpreted by 2Pac as a mockery of his 1994 robbery. Though both B.I.G. and Puff Daddy denied involvement and asserted that "Who Shot Ya?" had been recorded before the robbery, 2Pac nevertheless retorted on several tracks, most famously "Hit 'Em Up" in 1996.

Another major feud from this era was the feud between Jay-Z and Nas in the late 1990s and early 2000s. Jay-Z dissed Nas (as well as Prodigy of Mobb Deep) on the 2001 track "Takeover", and Nas retorted later that year with "Ether." Ether in particular has come to be seen as a "classic" diss track, and caused "ether" to emerge as a slang term meaning to ruthlessly defeat someone in a rap battle.

Contemporary hip-hop rivalries 
In the 2010s, rivalries among hip-hop musicians have birthed numerous notable diss tracks.

After years of a reported feud and subtle references, rapper Pusha T called out Lil Wayne, as well as Wayne's Cash Money and Young Money record labels, in a 2012 song titled "Exodus 23:1". Lil Wayne responded with a diss track of his own, "Ghoulish". Drake, who at the time was signed to Young Money, subsequently entered the feud with "Tuscan Leather", a song on his 2013 album Nothing Was the Same. Pusha T and Drake then recorded several further diss tracks against each other. In 2016, Pusha T released the freestyle "H.G.T.V." and Drake responded with "Two Birds, One Stone". Pusha T then continued the feud with "Infrared", the closing track of his 2018 album DAYTONA. This song sparked the response "Duppy Freestyle" from Drake, to which Pusha T responded with "The Story of Adidon". The cover of "The Story of Adidon" depicted a young Drake in blackface and featured lyrics revealing that Drake had a son. Due to Drake's high level of commercial success and popularity, the feud and the diss tracks that followed received significant coverage from hip hop media and beyond.

In 2015, Drake also engaged in a feud against rapper Meek Mill, who alleged that Drake used ghostwriters for his music. Drake's second diss track in response to the allegations was "Back to Back", which went on to become a critical and commercial success.

In 2017, Rapper Remy Ma released a diss track aimed at Nicki Minaj named "Shether", a reference to Nas' "Ether", using the same beat.

In 2018, rapper Eminem, who had a long history of being embroiled in feuds, released "Killshot" in response to Machine Gun Kelly's diss "Rap Devil". Collectively, the official uploads to YouTube alone have raised more than 800 million views as of 2023.

Online renaissance
Diss tracks found a resurgence in the late 2010s as personalities from platforms outside of music, especially YouTubers, entered the medium. Diss tracks performed especially well on the platform, often drawing tens or hundreds of millions of views, spawning internet memes, and earning millions of dollars in AdSense revenue for their creators. Notable participants in this movement included Logan Paul, Jake Paul, RiceGum, and KSI, with PewDiePie and IDubbbzTV being large creators who've engaged in diss track parodies.

In 2018, YouTuber Jake Paul was certified RIAA platinum for his track "It's Everyday Bro", and YouTubers RiceGum and Alissa Violet were certified platinum for "It's Every Night Sis", the diss track they made in response.

In 2022, Rapper Pusha T and Arby's made a diss track against McDonald's Filet-O-Fish, saying, "A little cube of fish from a clown is basic", among other criticisms.

See also
Flyting
List of diss tracks
Answer song
Battle rap
The Dozens
O du eselhafter Peierl
Invective

References

 
 
 
Hip hop terminology